In geometry, the triaugmented hexagonal prism is one of the Johnson solids. As the name suggests, it can be constructed by triply augmenting a hexagonal prism by attaching square pyramids to three of its nonadjacent equatorial faces.

See also 
 Hexagonal prism

References

External links 
 

Johnson solids